Club 21 was a dive bar located in the Kerns neighborhood, in northeast Portland, Oregon.

History
The bar was housed in a "castle-shaped" building constructed as a Russian Orthodox church during the 1930s. Late 2016 plans to relocate the building were abandoned because it was deemed structurally unsound. Club 21, which opened in the late 1960s, closed on January 15, 2017.

References

External links

 
 

1960s establishments in Oregon
2017 disestablishments in Oregon
Defunct drinking establishments in Oregon
Kerns, Portland, Oregon
Northeast Portland, Oregon